The Rebel is a 1980 French drama film directed by Gérard Blain and starring Patrick Norbert. It tells the story of a 20-year-old who sees himself as a revolutionary but rejects all ideologies, and has to tend for his younger sister when their mother dies.

Cast
 Patrick Norbert as Pierre
 Michel Subor as Hubert Beaufils
 Isabelle Rosais as Nathalie
 Jean-Jacques Aublanc as Alain
 Françoise Michaud as Corinne
 Alain Jérôme as Jean-Claude
 Robert Delarue as the police commissar
 Germaine Ledoyen as Mme Roussel
 Monique Gilliot as the social assistant
 Maurice Rollet as André Chardonnet
 Hervé Claude as Hervé Claude

References

1980 drama films
1980 LGBT-related films
1980 films
Films directed by Gérard Blain
French drama films
1980s French-language films
1980s French films